Kinesin family member 19 (KIF19) is a protein in humans encoded by the KIF19 gene. It is part of the kinesin family of motor proteins.

Function 
KIF19 is involved in cancer metastasis, as well as cell-cell and cell-matrix interactions.

References 

Motor proteins